Panzertruppenschule I (Armoured Troops School No.1) was the first of two major schools set up by the German Panzerwaffe in World War II to train German armour officers to operate Panzers. It was based in Munster, Lower Saxony, Germany.

The Panzertruppenschule was a 'branch school', where officer candidates were sent after 12–16 weeks spent in basic training, and having successfully undertaken an 8-week course at a Kriegsschule.
Prospective panzer troops in the rank of  Fähnrich undertook a 16-week training course which aimed to familiarise the officer candidates with the nuances and workings of a Panzer, and also with the tactics to be used when commanding panzers in the field.

Upon graduation, the recruit was promoted to Oberfähnrich and sent on field probation.

In June 1943, the only known flame-throwing versions of the StuG III, designated StuG III (Flamm) were delivered to the school, but were shortly thereafter destroyed by a fire started by a faulty flamethrower.

In late 1943, the school was stripped of its experienced instructors, who were used to form the élite Panzer-Lehr-Division.

See also
 Panzertruppe, Kriegsschule, Panzer, Panzer division
 Heer, Wehrmacht, Panzerwaffe
 Panzertruppenschule II, Panzer-Lehr-Division
Panzertruppenschule Kama
 Tigerfibel, the cartoon format training manual for the Tiger

Military education and training in Germany
Military units and formations of Germany in World War II